This is a list of spacefarers natives from Ibero-America.

List

Orbital

Suborbital

Without flying
Astronauts who is still on active duty awaiting their first assignment:

References

Ibero-America
Lists of astronauts by nationality